was a Japanese medical doctor. He received a M.D. from the University of Tokyo in 1936 and a PhD from the same institution in 1947, after imprisonment for anti-war views during World War II. In 1946, Wakatsuki performed Japan's first tubercular spinal caries and also organised its first blood bank. He founded the Japanese Association of Rural Medicine. Wakatsuki was awarded the 1976 Ramon Magsaysay Award for his contributions to rural medicine, as well as the Order of the Rising Sun with Gold and Silver Star in 1981.  He died of pneumonia in August 2006, at the age of 96.

References

1910 births
2006 deaths
Japanese general practitioners
Recipients of the Order of the Rising Sun, 2nd class
University of Tokyo alumni
Deaths from pneumonia in Japan